The Wah Mee massacre was a mass shooting that occurred during the night of February 18–19, 1983, in which Kwan Fai "Willie" Mak, Wai Chiu "Tony" Ng, and Keung Kin "Benjamin" Ng (no relation) bound, robbed, and shot fourteen people in the Wah Mee gambling club at the Louisa Hotel in Chinatown-International District, Seattle. Thirteen of their victims died, but Wai Chin, a dealer at the Wah Mee, survived to testify against the three in the separate high-profile trials held in 1983 and 1985. It is the deadliest mass murder in Washington state history.

Massacre

Louisa Hotel and Wah Mee Club 

The Louisa Hotel was built in 1909. Both before and after that purchase, it functioned as a single room occupancy hotel (SRO) with street-level spaces for shops and restaurants until 1970, when tightened building codes led to the closure of the SRO portion.

Two nightclubs operated illegally in the basement space of the Louisa Hotel by the 1920s. The one in the western half, entered from Maynard Alley South, was originally named Blue Heaven. At its height, patrons of many ethnic backgrounds visited for the gambling, dancing, and other forms of entertainment. By the 1950s, the club had been renamed to Wah Mee, known for high-stakes gaming. The Wah Mee operated illegally, as contemporary local blue laws required clubs to close before midnight; it was raided by police in 1972. By the 1980s, the Wah Mee had gained a much seedier reputation as a dive bar.

Planning and motive
The Wah Mee's regulars included many wealthy restaurant owners, several of whom were among the victims. Many of the victims were members of the Bing Kung Tong. According to witnesses for the subsequent prosecution, Mak had been planning the robbery for some time, discussing on multiple occasions his idea to rob a gambling club and kill the witnesses. He eventually enlisted the help of Benjamin Ng; both Ng and Mak had previously attended Cleveland High School. and both worked at the same restaurant in Blaine in 1981. Both were also suspects in prior crimes, including the killing of two Chinese women on July 16, 1982.

Tony Ng (no relation to Benjamin Ng) was brought into the group as a "last-minute recruit". According to the testimony of Tony Ng at his 1985 trial, he owed Mak $1,000 after gambling with Mak the night before the massacre. Mak offered to forgive the debt if he would participate in a shakedown at the Wah Mee Club. The day before the robbery, Tony Ng borrowed $1,000 to repay Mak; instead of accepting the money, Mak drew a gun, shot a bullet at Ng's feet, and threatened to kill Ng and his girlfriend, then destroy the Ng family's restaurant if Ng went to the police.

Security at the club was based in part on a system of passing through two sets of locked doors, which had been used in similar Chinatown gambling dens for generations, and had usually been quite effective. The security office at the front of the club had four rows of opaque glass blocks; one block facing the vestibule was transparent so the security guard on duty could identify patrons and staff. The outer set of doors could only be unlocked from the inside by the guard. Mak and his accomplices defeated the system only because they were known and trusted by the people at the club. During the initial investigation, police stated there were no signs of resistance from the victims; a spokesman said he "believe[d] they recognized [the killers]." Their presumed intent in killing all occupants was to leave no witnesses since club patrons could have readily identified them — as the one survivor, club dealer Wai Yok Chin, did.

Sequence
Chin arrived at approximately 11:50–11:55 PM the night of February 18 for his regular shift as a pai gow dealer, which started at midnight. Shortly after his shift began, Chin saw either Willie Mak or Benjamin Ng (the identity varies depending on the source), both of whom he recognized as club patrons, enter with a man he did not know (later identified as Tony Ng). Both Mak (or Ng) and Tony Ng then drew their guns, ordering everyone to lie down on the club's lower level. At the time, there were ten other patrons and staff present besides the three gunmen. Approximately ten minutes later, either Benjamin Ng or Willie Mak entered the club; Mak stood on the club's upper level with a drawn gun, supervising Benjamin and Tony Ng as they methodically hogtied each victim's hands and feet with rope, laying them on their stomachs before proceeding to rob the victims of their wallets and money.

While the robbery was in progress, four more patrons arrived; they too were bound and robbed. Wai Chin convinced Tony Ng, who was tying his bonds, to loosen the rope, as there was "no need to tie so tight, I'm an old man". Once everyone was tied up, Wai Chin heard and was struck by gunfire in the neck and jaw, and lapsed into unconsciousness. Tony Ng testified at his trial that although he had a gun, he never used it and was forced to participate in the robbery under duress. According to Tony Ng, Mak instructed him to take the money and leave after all the victims had been bound; Ng fled across the alley to the Hop Sing Club to wait for Benjamin and Willie. Ng further testified that he heard gunshots after he had already exited the Wah Mee. When Chin came to, he was able to loosen his ropes and staggered outside at 12:44 AM, where he was able to find help from three patrons who had been buzzing to gain entry to the club. After the police arrived, they found twelve dead; one more victim subsequently died of his injuries at the hospital, and Wai Yok Chin was the sole survivor.

According to the police, 32 shots were fired in total; 26 of those were fired from the same .22 caliber gun. Each victim had been shot in the head at least once.

Aftermath

After the shooting, the doors to the club were padlocked shut, and the contents were not disturbed after the police left. The club was never reopened, although the site was a popular stop for tour buses.

A spokesman for the Hop Sing Tong denied the massacre was an act of war against the Bing Kung Tong; Benjamin Ng and Willie Mak were both members of the Hop Sing, and most of the victims were members of the Bing Kung.

Wai Yok Chin, the sole survivor of the massacre, made a full recovery, despite an early medical setback and possible assassination threats that forced prosecutors to depose him on videotape prior to the trials. He died in May 1993, aged 71.

The building continued to host street-level businesses until a fire on Christmas Eve 2013 destroyed the top floor and interior of the building. The Woo family, who still owned the building, decided to demolish the fire-damaged portion (which included all of the former Wah Mee space) while retaining as much of the building as possible to preserve its contribution to the Chinatown Historic District. Demolition work was completed in April 2015. Reconstruction began February 12, 2018, with a blessing by Buddhist monks and a procession. The Louisa Hotel building reopened June 2019, with 85 rental apartments plus street-level retail and restaurant space.

Victims

 John Loui, no age given 
 Chong L. Chinn, no age given
 Wing Wong, 59
 Moo Min Mar, 52
 Jean Mar, 47
 Henning Chinn, 52
 Dewey Mar, no age given
 Gim Lun Wong, no age given 
 Hung Fat Gee, about 50
 George Mar, in his 50s
 Jack Mar, in his 50s 
 Chinn Lee Law, in his 50s 
 Chin Wing, in his 50s

Arrests
Wai Yok Chin was able to identify both Benjamin Ng and Willie Mak for the police; the identity of the third gunman was unknown to him.

In the early morning of February 19, the police went to the home of Benjamin Ng's brother, Stephen, who told them that Benjamin lived with his girlfriend in her parents' home. The police arrested Benjamin at the girlfriend's home, where he had been sleeping. After obtaining a search warrant, the police returned later that afternoon to find $7,500 in cash, two loaded .38 caliber revolvers, an M-1 rifle, and ammunition in the bedroom.

Willie Mak called and turned himself in to police hours later. Shortly after his arrest, Mak confessed that he had "shot them all", a statement he later repudiated. Police recovered more guns and cash from Mak's home on February 19, but none of the guns matched those used in the murders. An unidentified third man, who accompanied Mak to the surrender, was questioned and released. Two men, including Mak's older brother, were accused of destroying evidence of the crime; Mak had borrowed a car from one of the men the night of the massacre.

Police identified Wai Chiu "Tony" Ng as the third suspect and issued a federal warrant for his arrest on March 31, 1983. After speaking with his mother the morning after the massacre, Tony Ng fled to Canada upon learning that thirteen had been killed. The Bing Kung Tong offered a  reward for information leading to his arrest and conviction. On June 15, 1984 Tony Ng became the 387th person to be listed on the FBI's Ten Most Wanted Fugitives list. He was arrested October 4, 1984 in Calgary, Alberta, Canada by the Royal Canadian Mounted Police, acting on a tip made to Seattle police. At the time, Ng was working as an electronics assembly technician under the alias Jim Wong, living with a roommate who was unaware of his fugitive status; police suspected he had been partially supported by his family. His extradition to the United States was blocked by his Canadian lawyer until American authorities dropped the charges that could have resulted in the death penalty.

Trials and sentencing
On February 24, 1983, Benjamin Ng and Willie Mak were charged with thirteen counts of aggravated first-degree murder and one count of first degree assault.  Benjamin Ng was represented by Seattle defense lawyer John Henry Browne. Mak was represented by the associated counsel for the accused, lawyers Jim Robinson and Don Madsen. The State was represented by William Downing and Robert Lasnik. On March 22, Judge Frank D. Howard set a preliminary trial date for both Benjamin Ng and Willie Mak for April 20, but they were tried separately because the defense believed Mak would blame Ng. Tony Ng was named the third suspect, charged in absentia on March 30, 1983 with thirteen counts of aggravated first-degree murder.

Benjamin Ng
On August 25, 1983, Benjamin Ng was convicted on the thirteen counts of aggravated first-degree murder after two to three hours of deliberation and was sentenced to life in prison without the possibility of parole on the next day. During the sentencing phase, Ng's mother testified on his behalf, stating the family had emigrated from Hong Kong in 1975; while still in Hong Kong, Ng had been beaten on the head repeatedly with a piece of wood, resulting in brain damage, as corroborated by medical experts.

Jury selection for the trial began on August 9. Initially, Ng's defense claimed he did not shoot anyone, as the weapons found in the bedroom of his girlfriend were a different caliber, but the prosecution asserted that .22 caliber shell casings recovered at the Wah Mee scene matched a gun that Ng once fired. During the trial, Ng's attorney conceded that he had participated in the robbery and was guilty of first-degree murder, but not aggravated first-degree murder; the distinction, had he been convicted of first-degree murder without aggravation, would have made him ineligible for the death penalty and would have raised the possibility of parole. The defense had contended that although Benjamin Ng had participated in planning the robbery, he did not plan to murder the victims to silence potential witnesses. The jury concluded that Ng had killed in furtherance of the robbery, justifying the aggravated murder enhancement.

Ng was sentenced to a 15th life sentence in December 1983, after testimony accusing him of the unrelated murder of Franklin Leach on October 22, 1981, was introduced during Mak's trial.

Willie Mak
On October 6, 1983, Willie Mak was convicted of 13 counts of aggravated first-degree murder and one count of first-degree assault and sentenced to death on October 22. On April 24, 1986, the Washington State Supreme Court upheld the verdict and death sentence.

Jury selection for the trial began on September 12. The defense were expected to blame an unnamed individual who wished to gain control over illegal gambling operations in Chinatown. At his trial, Mak claimed that he had only gone to the Wah Mee to rough up a patron as retaliation for the beating of a senior Hop Sing Tong official. Mak, a member of the Hop Sing along with Benjamin Ng, claimed he was directed to do so by Roy Chu, president of the Hop Sing, an allegation which Chu denied. According to Mak's testimony, Benjamin Ng and his companion were independently robbing the patrons and Mak left before any shooting occurred, but he heard "snapping sounds" as he left. In addition, Mak's lawyer argued that Benjamin Ng was the shooter at the Wah Mee by blaming Ng for the unsolved murder of Franklin Leach, aged 71, in 1981. According to Jim Robinson, Leach was shot when he jogged by Mak and Ng as they were dumping a stolen safe into Lake Washington. During the trial, prosecutors and police used hypnosis to change the testimony of a defense witness.

On February 17, 1987 the Washington State Supreme Court issued a stay of execution a month before Willie Mak's scheduled execution, but on May 2, 1988 the State Supreme Court let Mak's murder conviction stand. However, on November 10, 1988, Willie Mak's execution was delayed indefinitely by a federal judge. On January 8, 1991 U.S. District Judge William Dwyer overturned Willie Mak's death sentence, saying Mak's attorneys failed to present evidence on their client's background that could have saved his life. On July 16, 1992, the 9th U.S. Circuit Court of Appeals refused to reinstate Mak's death sentence.

On November 9, 1994, a King County Superior Court judge denied Mak's bid for a new trial but allowed prosecutors to hold a new sentencing hearing. On February 15, 2002, a King County Superior Court judge scheduled a sentencing hearing for September 2002. On April 29, 2002, a King County Superior Court judge ruled that Mak will not face the death penalty because the 1983 jury wasn't asked to determine how much of a role he had in the crime. Mak was resentenced to life without parole.

Tony Ng
Tony Ng was acquitted on April 19, 1985, of murder, but convicted of 13 counts of first-degree robbery and a single count of assault with a deadly weapon. Each robbery charge brought a minimum sentence of five years, some to be served consecutively. On July 3, 1985, Tony Ng was sentenced to 13 life terms, one for each count of first-degree robbery, which would mean a term of 35 years in total.

The jury selection for Tony Ng's trial was completed on April 4 after four days of proceedings. Tony Ng was represented at his trial by Mark Mestel and John Muenster. Defense attorneys questioned whether the 45-minute statement Ng gave to the RCMP upon his arrest in Calgary was admissible, as he had not been advised of his rights. Prior to the trial, prosecutors stated they would not seek the death penalty, as the earlier trials of Benjamin Ng and Mak showed that Tony Ng did not play a part in the planning of the crime. At his trial, the defense argued that Ng "had no reason in the world to [participate in the robbery]" and drew a contrast between the "homicidal maniacs" Mak and Benjamin Ng and his client, characterized as quiet, shy, and passive. The prosecution countered by asking why Mak and Benjamin Ng would "drag an unwilling witness into a crime that had as a central facet the elimination of all witnesses".

In 1997, federal magistrate John Weinberg concluded that Ng did not receive a fair trial in 1985 and recommended either his release or a new trial. No action was required unless a U.S. District Court judge acted on his recommendation.

On September 6, 2006, a parole board met to determine whether Tony Ng should receive parole on his 12th robbery term. If given parole, he would begin serving his 13th term, with the potential to be eligible for parole and freed in 2010. Both former King County Prosecuting Attorney Norm Maleng and former Seattle Police Chief Patrick Fitzsimons asked the parole board to deny parole on the 12th count. Relatives of the victims who came to the hearing expressed outrage that they were not made aware of previous parole hearings and that Tony Ng was so close to possible release because of it. Ng was denied parole in 2007, which meant he could not begin serving time on the final count.

In December 2009, the parole of Tony Ng again came before the state parole board; relatives of the victims again spoke before the board, urging against his release. On February 2010, a parole board unanimously decided "now is the time to parole Mr. [Tony] Ng to his final count." On October 24, 2013, Tony Ng was granted parole. Although the relatives of the victims continued to oppose the parole, he was released on October 25, 2013, from state prison directly to the Northwest detention center in Tacoma, into the custody of the U.S. Immigration and Customs Enforcement for deportation proceedings. He was deported to Hong Kong on May 14, 2014.

See also
Louisa Hotel
List of massacres in the United States
Golden Dragon massacre
History of Chinese Americans in Seattle

References

External links
"Wah Mee e-book by Todd Matthews" at wahmee.com
Wah Mee Massacre at HistoryLink
"Massacre @ South King Street" at Mutterings of a Mad Race
 

1983 in Washington (state)
1983 murders in the United States
Massacres in 1983
Chinese-American history
Chinese-American organized crime events
1980s in Seattle
1983 mass shootings in the United States
Murder in Washington (state)
People murdered by Chinese-American organized crime
Crimes in Washington (state)
Deaths by firearm in Washington (state)
February 1983 events in the United States
Mass shootings in Washington (state)
Mass shootings in the United States